Saurita nox is a moth in the subfamily Arctiinae. It was described by Herbert Druce in 1896. It is found in Honduras and Venezuela.

References

Moths described in 1896
Saurita